Annie Chu, FAIA, is a Chinese-American architect, interior designer, and academic in Los Angeles known for "the fusion of art and design." As an educator working across the U.S. and abroad, Chu was recognized as a 2016 Presidential Honoree of the Los Angeles chapter of the American Institute of Architects' (AIA) Distinguished Educator Award. 

Chu was later appointed Vice President of the International Interior Design Association (IIDA) Board of Directors, which supports clients through a network of 16,000+ members across 58 countries. Chu has expressed support for women designers and has stated, “perhaps they are more likely to listen and empathize, and to find ways to integrate responses into design and project management."

Chu is a Fellow of the American Institute of Architects. She is also the co-principal with Rick Gooding and partner to Michael Matteucci at Chu + Gooding Architects, a Los Angeles-based design firm. She is a professor of interior architecture at Woodbury University. She received her Bachelor's degree in Architecture from SCI-Arc and a Master's degree in Building Science from Columbia University. Chu also participated in organizing the Unmentionables Symposium at Woodbury University Hollywood Outpost (WUHO Gallery) in Hollywood on April 6, 2019.

References

Architects from Los Angeles
Living people
Fellows of the American Institute of Architects
Woodbury University faculty
California women architects
Year of birth missing (living people)
American women academics
21st-century American women